Sector 27 were an English new wave band founded in 1979 by Tom Robinson. Their 1980 debut album, Sector 27, was produced by Steve Lillywhite.  Robinson subsequently left the band, and the band continued without him for a number of years. Sector 27 toured with Elton John and The Police.

History
Tom Robinson formed the band in late 1979 as an effort to begin a new direction. The band made their debut in Liverpool on 11 January 1980. The band released their first records on their own label, Panic Records. Later releases were on Fontana Records, with releases in the US on I.R.S. Records. The first album was produced by Steve Lillywhite.

After Robinson and Derek Quinton had left, the band released a single on Rocket Records: "Excalibur" (1984), produced by Phil Harding.

Personnel
Tom Robinson - vocals, guitar
Stevie B. (Blanchard) - guitar, vocals
Jo Burt - bass, vocals
Derek Quinton - drums
Martin "Red" Broad - drums (1984, after Robinson and Quinton had left)

Discography

Albums

Sector 27 was the band's only album release. It was critically well-received; but had little commercial success, even though it got airplay on more than 60 U.S. radio stations. It was re-released in 1996 with additional tracks under the title Sector 27 Complete.

Singles
July 1980 "Not Ready" / "Can't Keep Away" - UK Indie no. 4
October 1980 "Invitation: What Have We Got to Lose?" / "Dungannon"
January 1981 "Total Recall" / "Stornoway"
May 1981 "Martin's Gone" / "Christopher Calling" produced by Richard Strange
1984 "Excalibur" / "How I Feel"
1984 "Excalibur" / "How I Feel" / "Christopher Calling"
1985 "Conversation" / "How I Feel"

References

Sources
Strong, Martin Charles.  The Great Indie Discography.  Canongate U.S., 2003, 
Gimarc, George. Punk diary: the Ultimate Trainspotter's Guide to Underground Rock, 1970–1982, Backbeat Books, 2006, 
Gimarc, George. Post Punk Diary: 1980–1982, St. Martin's Press, 1997, 
Swenson, John. The Year in Rock, 1981–82, Delilah Books, 1981,

External links

 . 1980 release
 . 1996 re-release with additional tracks, Fontana CD 532642-2
 
 

English new wave musical groups
Musical groups established in 1979
Albums produced by Steve Lillywhite
1980 albums
1996 albums